Ptychadena mahnerti is a species of frog in the family Ptychadenidae.
It is found in Kenya and possibly Uganda.
Its natural habitats are subtropical or tropical high-altitude grassland, swamps, freshwater marshes, pastureland, and ponds.
It is threatened by habitat loss.

References

Ptychadena
Taxonomy articles created by Polbot
Amphibians described in 1996